Huayuan railway station is a station on Beijing–Guangzhou railway in Xiaochang County, Xiaogan, Hubei.

History
The station was established in 1902.

References

Railway stations in Hubei
Stations on the Beijing–Guangzhou Railway
Railway stations in China opened in 1902